The Eastbourne International is a tennis tournament on the WTA Tour and the ATP Tour held at the Devonshire Park Lawn Tennis Club, Eastbourne, United Kingdom. Held since 1974, it is classified as a WTA 500 series on the WTA Tour and an ATP Tour 250 series on the ATP Tour. The tournament is played on outdoor grass courts, and is generally considered a "warm-up" for the Wimbledon Championships, a major tournament, which begins the following week. It was originally just part of the WTA Tour, but from 2009 it was combined as an ATP Tour event. It replaced the Nottingham Open grass court tournament from 2009–2014. Nottingham returned for 2015–2016 with no ATP Tour event in Eastbourne, however Eastbourne replaced the Nottingham event again from 2017 onwards. As of 2021, it is sponsored by Viking Cruises, with past sponsors including Nature Valley and AEGON.

Combination
During 2007, lack of sponsorship for the Eastbourne tournament led the Lawn Tennis Association to consider moving the tournament to London.  However, as part of a general reorganisation of United Kingdom professional tennis tournaments, it was instead decided to merge the event with the Nottingham Open, traditionally held during the same week. From 2009, therefore, the Eastbourne courts have hosted a combined women's and men's event until 2014. In 2015 and 2016 it was an only a Ladies event (with the men's competition returning to Nottingham). In 2017, the Eastbourne tournament returned to being a combined event.

Past winners
Martina Navratilova holds the record for the most singles titles with 11.

Finals

Women's singles

Women's champions by country

Men's singles

Men's champions by country

Doubles finals

Women

Women's champions by country

Men

Men's champions by country

See also
 Sport in Sussex

References

External links

 
 LTA tournament website

 
Sport in Eastbourne
Grass court tennis tournaments
WTA Tour
Recurring sporting events established in 1974
Tennis tournaments in England
ATP Tour 250